Trogoxylon aequale is a species of powder-post beetle in the family Bostrichidae. It is found in Africa, the Caribbean, Europe and Northern Asia (excluding China), Central America, North America, and South America.

References

Further reading

External links

 

Bostrichidae
Articles created by Qbugbot
Beetles described in 1867